Eupithecia sclerata is a moth in the family Geometridae. It is found in China.

References

Moths described in 1982
sclerata
Moths of Asia